Edan Gross (born October 10, 1978) is an American businessman and former child actor.

Career
He appeared in many guest spots on television programs in the 1980s and 1990s including Cheers, Murphy Brown, The Golden Girls, Empty Nest, Newhart, Highway to Heaven, Married... with Children, Northern Exposure, and Herman's Head. He was also featured as a regular on the short-lived sitcoms Sweet Surrender (NBC, 1987), Free Spirit (ABC, 1989–1990) and Walter & Emily (NBC, 1991–1992). Additionally, Gross was the voice of the Good Guy dolls in Child's Play, the "Corky doll" from the Cricket doll series, the title character of the animated series Little Dracula, Flounder on the animated series The Little Mermaid and Waif in the computer game Return to Zork.

He also voiced Tyrone Turtle on Tiny Toon Adventures, Christopher Robin on the Christmas special Winnie the Pooh and Christmas Too, Merton on the ABC Weekend Special Runaway Ralph, Bitsy on the Yogi Bear special Yogi's Great Escape and did various voices on The Ren and Stimpy Show, TaleSpin, Pound Puppies, ProStars, Timeless Tales from Hallmark, Superman and Wally on the television special The Halloween Tree.

He was the president of 3TAC Distribution, Inc. from December 17, 2013, until its dissolution on April 1, 2016.

Filmography

Live-action
ABC Weekend Specials - Merton
Cheers - Child #2
Daddy - Matty Burnette
Murphy Brown - Joey
Acceptable Risks - Jake Snyder
The Golden Girls - The Boy
Empty Nest - Jeffrey Millstein
Newhart - Little Boy
Highway to Heaven - Kid #2
Married... with Children - Young Al Bundy, Carl
Northern Exposure - Brad Young, "Survival of the Species" (4-11, January 4, 1993)
Best of the Best - Walter Grady
Best of the Best II - Walter Grady
Herman's Head - Little Herman
Trapper John, M.D. - Joshua Gordon
Superboy - Young Clark
Walter & Emily - Hartley
Child's Play - Friendly Chucky / Kid in Animated Commercial / Oscar Doll
Child's Play 2 - Tommy Doll
Child's Play 3 - Good Guy Doll / Larry Doll / Pauly Doll
Webster - Sherman Berman
Sweet Surrender - Bart Holden
The Tracey Ullman Show' - David HavershimThe Twilight Zone - BoyMikey - Classroom KidAnd You Thought Your Parents Were Weird - Max CarsonLisa - RalphRenegade - KennyWe'll Take Manhattan - RockyFree Spirit - Gene Harper

AnimationTiny Toon Adventures - Tyrone TurtleWinnie the Pooh and Christmas Too - Christopher RobinThe Little Mermaid - Flounder (Season 1)The Ren and Stimpy Show - Additional voicesTaleSpin - BobboLittle Dracula - Little DraculaProStars - Additional voicesPound Puppies - JerryFoofur - Additional voicesSuperman - Scout KidThe Legend of Prince Valiant - Brother Paul, Young Arthur, BoyThe Karate Kid - Additional voicesTimeless Tales from Hallmark - Additional voicesThe Halloween Tree - Tom SkeltonYogi's Great Escape - Bitsy

Video gamesReturn to Zork'' - Waif

References

External links

1978 births
American male child actors
Place of birth missing (living people)
American male television actors
American male voice actors
Living people